Thomas Whaley (October 5, 1823 – December 14, 1890) was an early settler of San Diego, California. The residence he built there in 1857 is now a public museum called Whaley House.

Biography
Whaley was born in Manhattan, New York City, 1823 to Thomas Alexander Whaley Sr. and Rachel Pye. His father died in 1832 and his will said Thomas should receive a liberal education.

Whaley left for California during the California Gold Rush, and ending up working in San Francisco stores. This became successful, but was lost after an arson fire in 1851.  He was advised to go to San Diego, so he and Lewis Franklin sailed there in 1851 and opened a store called Tienda California. He studied Spanish so he could sell to the Kumeyaay native people. The next year Franklin sold out to Whaley, and Whaley had a succession of other partners.

Whaley married Anna Eloise DeLaunay in 1853 in New York. She was born March 31, 1832 in New York City to a French family. They had six children, including Anna Amelia, George Hay Ringgold, Violet Eloise, and Corinne Lillian.

Whaley was appointed President for the San Diego city Board of Trustees (informally called "Mayor") during 1858–1859. Whaley was a Whig, though the position was officially non-partisan.

In 1857, Thomas Whaley built a house in San Diego, in the area now referred to as Old Town. It was the first brick house in San Diego. The bricks were made at Whaley's kiln in Old Town, and the walls were finished with plaster made from ground seashells. The one-story wing served as the county courthouse during 1869–1870, with upstairs rooms used as San Diego's first commercial theater and meeting rooms for the County Board of Supervisors and record storage. At times, part of the downstairs was a store. The Whaley Family lived in the home off and on until 1885, when they moved into a new home in New Town (now Downtown) San Diego. The brick house in Old Town is now a museum, Whaley House, at 2482 San Diego Avenue. It is thought by some to be haunted.

Whaley died in Old Town San Diego 1890. His wife Anna died February 24, 1913. They are buried at Mount Hope Cemetery.

According to the Travel Channel's "America's Most Haunted" TV show, the house was featured as the number one most haunted house in the United States.

See also 
 Whaley House

References

External links and further reading

 "San Diego Paranormal Research Project"
 "The Whaley House", The Journal of San Diego History 6:2 (April 1960) by June A. Strudwick
 San Diego Historical Society biography
 Thomas Whaley House
 Consignments to El Dorado: A Record of the Voyage of the Sutton (1972) , has Whaley's journal during his voyage from New York to San Francisco in 1849.
 "Thomas Whaley." History, San Diego State University thesis, 1963, by Robert W. Haven.

1823 births
1890 deaths
Politicians from San Diego
People of the California Gold Rush
Burials at Mount Hope Cemetery (San Diego)